Punnagai Poove is a 2003 Indian Tamil-language  romantic drama film directed by Sabapathy Dekshinamurthy and written by R. N. R. Manohar, starring Nandhaa of Mounam Pesiyadhe fame, newcomer Rekha Vedavyas and Kaveri in lead and the likes of Vadivelu, Senthil and renowned music composer M. S. Viswanathan in other supporting roles, whilst Bollywood actress Sarika, ex-wife of Kamal Haasan, making a comeback to Tamil films after 17 years, and music composer Yuvan Shankar Raja, who scored the music for this film as well, make special cameo appearances in the film.

Plot

The story revolves around two best friends, Meera and Nithya with contrasting personalities. Meera is an extrovert while Nithya is an introvert. They have been friends since childhood and work in the IT industry in Chennai. They live as roommates in an apartment community, into which a handsome young man Venkatraman, moves into. As time goes on, Meera is attracted to Venkat when he handles certain issues with his wisdom and good nature. She makes a phone call to appreciate him and eventually, through multiple long telephonic conversations, they become friends. Their friendship blossoms into love without meeting in real life. Nithya understands this development in Meera's relationship status as well.

Venkat becomes impatient with Meera's prolonged elusiveness and plans to meet her in person. He surprises her by walking to her apartment while she is speaking on the phone with him. But at the last minute, Meera gets distracted by another phone call and thrusts the landline phone into Nithya's hands and walks away. Venkat walks into the apartment and mistakes Nithya for Meera and kisses her to express his love and leaves the place. Nithya is shell-shocked and is at a loss of words. Meera is oblivious to all this because the  call she received is a family emergency and she leaves to her hometown immediately, without noticing Nithya or Venkat.

Over the next few days, Nithya suffers with fever alone and refuses to attend further calls from Venkat. He decides to visit her, still under the impression that she was the one speaking to him all this while. When he finds out about her fever, he apologizes for his behavior but doesn't listen to her when she tries to tell him about the mistaken identity. He takes good care of her as she recovers, but Nithya is stricken with guilt at her inability to make him understand the truth. Soon, he shocks her once again by introducing her to his family and friends who tell about his good character and that she is lucky to have found Venkat. The same night Venkat proposes Nithya, who is overwhelmed by all the emotions and happiness from well wishers, and is unable to refuse his proposal or reveal the truth. She decides to play along and accept this new turn of events in her life.

When Meera returns from her hometown, Nithya is unable to face her. She tries to confuse Meera telling that Venkat was simply fooling around. Meera refuses to believe Nithya's accusations and challenges that she will continue to wait for Venkat to meet her in person, and express his love for her. Meanwhile, Nithya plants a false impression about Meera to Venkat that she is a possessive friend who is trying to sabotage their relationship, so he must not believe anything Meera tells hereafter. Venkat gets a chance to go abroad for his job and manages to secure a job for Nithya as well. While trying to inform this news and talk about their wedding plans to Nithya, Venkat accidentally meets Meera, who thinks that Venkat is back for her and is on cloud nine, assuming that he really loves her. A harmless conversation makes things worse, and Meera assumes that the wedding plans are for her as well.

Nithya is unable to bear the guilt of betraying both her friend and her fiancé and decides to tell the truth before they marry and leave for the States, when Meera meets with an accident and is critical at the hospital. Nithya confesses everything to an unconscious Meera and swears that she does not want to cheat her and marry Venkat. The day of the wedding arrives and Meera gains consciousness and goes to meet Nithya and Venkat. Nithya is ready to give up Venkat for Meera, but the latter refuses and forgives Nithya and willingly sacrifices her love for her friend. She says that they deserve each other and asks for Nithya's promise to keep this secret between themselves. Nithya and Venkat get married and a few years later we find that Meera has died as an unmarried woman, still holding the memories of her love for Venkat.

Cast

 Nandha as Venkatramanan (Venkat)
 Rekha Vedavyas as Meera
 Kaveri as Nithya
 Vadivelu as Aarumugam
 M. S. Viswanathan as Sachidanandhan
 Senthil
 Achamillai Gopi
 Charle as Sudhakar
 Anumohan
 Singamuthu
 Muthukaalai
 Thyagu as Moneylender 
 Shanti Williams as Meera's mother
 Nithya Ravindran as Nithya's mother
 Chitti Babu
 Bayilvan Ranganathan
 Yuvan Shankar Raja (Guest appearance in "En Kadhal")
 Premji Amaran (Guest appearance in "En Kadhal")
 Sarika (Special appearance in "Idhu Innaisaiya")

Soundtrack

The film score and soundtrack were composed by Yuvan Shankar Raja, who teamed up with director Sabapathy Dekshinamurthy for the first time. The soundtrack released on 3 November 2002 and features 8 tracks with lyrics penned by Arivumathi, Pa. Vijay, Pazhani Bharathi and M. Rathnakumar. For the first time, composer Yuvan Shankar Raja made an appearance in a film, by featuring in and performing one of the songs, "En Kadhal", which was sung by himself as well. One additional song, "Idhu Innisaiya", sung by Bollywood singer Hema Sardesai and Yuvan Shankar Raja, featuring Bollywood actress Sarika on screen, was not included in the soundtrack.

Not in the soundtrack
Other music featured in the film include:

 "Idhu Innaisaiya" - sung by Hema Sardesai & Yuvan Shankar Raja, composed by Yuvan Shankar Raja

Release

The film released on 25 April 2003.

Reception

Malathi Rangarajan of The Hindu in her review stated  "The story offers nothing new. Tales of unrequited love and mistaken identity have been seen on screen for years now. (The excellently enacted Savithri starrer of yore, "Kathirundha Kangal", and K. Balachander's "Thamarai Nenjam", to name a couple) It is the treatment that makes the difference in "Punnagai Poovae"."

References

External links
 

2003 films
Indian romantic drama films
2003 romantic drama films
2000s Tamil-language films
Films scored by Yuvan Shankar Raja
Films directed by Sabapathy Dekshinamurthy